River Ward or Ward 16 (French: Quartier Rivière) is a municipal ward located in Ottawa, Ontario. It is located in the south central portion of the city, and includes the communities of Carlington, Central Park, Carleton Heights, Mooney's Bay, Riverside Park, and Hunt Club/Uplands. The ward spans both sides of the Rideau River between Carling Avenue and Hunt Club Road.

Prior to amalgamation, this area was part of Mooney's Bay Ward, which existed from 1994 to 2000. Before this, the ward was called Riverside Ward which was created in 1980 from parts of Elmdale-Victoria Ward and Gloucester Ward.

City councillors
Jim Durrell (1981-1985)
George Brown (1986-1994)
Karin Howard (1995-1999)
Jim Bickford (1999-2000)
Wendy Stewart (2001-2003) 
Maria McRae (2003-2014)
Riley Brockington (2014–present)

Election results

1980

1982

1985

1988

1991

1994

1997

1999 by-election
A by-election was held on April 6, 1999 to replace Karin Howard who resigned her seat. Results:

2000

2003

2006

2010

2014

2018

2022

References

External links
 Map of River Ward (pdf)

Ottawa wards